Henri Fivaz was a sailor from Switzerland who represented his country at the 1928 Summer Olympics in Amsterdam, Netherlands.

Sources

External links
 

Year of birth missing
Possibly living people
Sailors at the 1928 Summer Olympics – 12' Dinghy
Olympic sailors of Switzerland
Swiss male sailors (sport)
20th-century Swiss people